Ilanga agulhaensis is a species of sea snail, a marine gastropod mollusk in the family Solariellidae.

Description
The height of the shell attains 5 mm, its diameter 7 mm. The growth lines form axial pleats at the rim of the umbilicus. The aperture is slightly triangular. The periphery is slightly convex 
.

Distribution
This marine species occurs off Southeast Africa

References

External links
 To World Register of Marine Species

agulhaensis
Gastropods described in 1925